Dobu Rural LLG is a local-level government (LLG) administering Dobu Island in Milne Bay Province, Papua New Guinea.

Wards
01. Maiabari
02. Bwakera
03. Koruwea
04. Io'o
05. Taulu
06. Sisiana
07. Miadeba
08. Darubia
09. Kenaia
10. Buduwagula
11. Nade
12. Sill'Ilugu
13. Wesoiliwe
14. Galibwa
15. Neboluwa
16. Salamo
17. Gomwa
18. Begasi
19. Du'una
20. Daguyala
21. Deidei
22. Bwaiowa
23. Sawa'edi
24. Waluma East
25. Waluma West
26. Sebutuya
27. Momoawa
28. Basima
29. Urua
30. Gameta
31. Duduna
32. Wadalei
33. Bosalewa
34. Gumawana
35. Sanaroa

References

Local-level governments of Milne Bay Province